Ruth Beatrice Henig, Baroness Henig CBE, DL (born Ruth Beatrice Munzer on 10 November 1943) is a British academic historian and Labour Party politician.

Family

Her parents were Kurt and Elfrieda Munzer, Jewish refugees who came to the United Kingdom from the Netherlands in 1940.  Henig was married in 1966 to fellow academic Stanley Henig, who shortly afterward became a Labour Member of Parliament (MP).  They have two children and divorced in 1993. Their son, Simon Henig, is the leader of the Durham County Council, chair of the North East Combined Authority, and a lecturer in politics at Sunderland University. She remarried in 1994 to Jack Johnstone.

Academic career
Henig was educated at Wyggeston Girls Grammar School in Leicester, and at Bedford College, London, where she graduated in 1965 with a B.A. in history.  She was awarded a PhD in history from Lancaster University in 1978, where she was a lecturer in Modern European History. She has written several books and pamphlets on 20th-century international history.

She served as Dean of the Faculty of Arts and Humanities from 1997 to 2000, and in April 2006, she was one of six people to receive the first Honorary Fellowships of Lancaster University.

Political career

Henig was a Labour member of Lancashire County Council from 1981 to 2005, serving as the Council's chair from 1999 to 2000.  She was also Chair of Lancashire Police Authority from 1995 to 2005 and chair of the Association of Police Authorities from 1997 to 2005, when she became the Association's president. She was also a member of the National Criminal Justice Board from 2003 to 2005.

At the 1992 general election, she stood as Labour candidate for her husband's former parliamentary seat of Lancaster.  She failed to unseat the sitting Conservative MP Elaine Kellett-Bowman, but reduced the Conservative majority to just under 3,000, down from 6,500 in 1987.

Henig was awarded a CBE in 2000 for services to policing, and in 2002 was appointed as a Deputy Lieutenant for Lancashire.

She was made a life peer on 8 June 2004 as Baroness Henig, of Lancaster in the County of Lancashire.  She became a Deputy Speaker in the House of Lords in 2015.

In June 2013 Baroness Henig was awarded with The Association of Security Consultant's Award, part of the Imbert Prize named after the former Commissioner of the Metropolitan Police and the Lord Lieutenant of Greater London.  In an industry first, the prize, awarded to the most person making the most notable contribution to the security industry in the preceding year was shared with Don Randall MBE, the head of security to the Bank of England.  It was judged that Baroness Henig's contributions to the industry as Chair of the Security Industry Authority in overseeing the regulatory overhaul and building of a new and modern, fit-for-purpose regulatory regime made he an outstanding candidate.

On 20 December 2006 the Home Secretary Dr John Reid MP appointed Lady Henig as Chairman of the Security Industry Authority (aka the “SIA”), a non-departmental public body tasked with the regulation of the private security industry. Having stepped down as Chair from the SIA after six years in March 2013, the Baroness continues to work towards building a unified voice for the industry having just been appointed as president of the Security Institute in April 2016. She is now non-executive chairman with UK firm SecuriGroup and, as of March 2019, the chairman of the Register of Chartered Security Professionals.

Interests
Lady Henig's main leisure activity is playing Bridge, having played for Lancashire since the early 1990s, and is currently the captain of the House of Lords team. Henig is also a keen football fan, supporting Leicester City FC for over 60 years.

References

1943 births
Living people
Labour Party (UK) life peers
Life peeresses created by Elizabeth II
British historians
Commanders of the Order of the British Empire
Alumni of Lancaster University
Academics of Lancaster University
Deputy Lieutenants of Lancashire
Members of Lancashire County Council
Alumni of Bedford College, London
Jewish British politicians
British women historians
Women councillors in England